George Moffatt (11 May 1806 – 20 February 1878) was a British Liberal Party politician.

He was the son of William And Alice Moffatt.

Political carear
He unsuccessfully attempted to enter the Commons at a by-election in Ipswich in 1842. He was Member of Parliament (MP) for Dartmouth 1845–52, Ashburton 1852–59, Honiton 1860–65, and  Southampton 1865–68. He subsequently contested the 1870 Isle of Wight by-election, losing by 35 votes.
He was also the owner of Goodrich Court, a neo-gothic castle in Herefordshire.

Marriage and Family
In 1856, he married Lucy Morrison (1825-1876), daughter of MP James Morrison
They had four children:
Alice Lucy Moffatt (1858-1922
Harold Charles Moffatt (1859-1945)
Ethel Gwendoline Moffatt (1861-1952), Wife of MP Howard Vincent
Hilda Eva Moffatt (1862-1947)

References

https://librivox.org/author/16301?primary_key=16301&search_category=author&search_page=1&search_form=get_results

External links 
 

1806 births
1878 deaths
Liberal Party (UK) MPs for English constituencies
UK MPs 1841–1847
UK MPs 1847–1852
UK MPs 1852–1857
UK MPs 1857–1859
UK MPs 1859–1865
UK MPs 1865–1868
Politicians from London
Members of the Parliament of the United Kingdom for Honiton
Members of the Parliament of the United Kingdom for Ashburton
Members of the Parliament of the United Kingdom for Dartmouth